John Renbourn is the debut album by John Renbourn.

Track listing
All tracks composed by John Renbourn, except where indicated.
 "Judy" 
 "Beth's Blues" (Blind Boy Fuller)
 "Song" (poem by John Donne)
 "Down on the Barge" 
 "John Henry" (Traditional; arranged by John Renbourn)
 "Plainsong" 
 "Louisiana Blues" (Muddy Waters)
 "Blue Bones" (Renbourn, Bert Jansch)
 "Train Tune" 
 "Candy Man" (Rev. Gary Davis)
 "The Wildest Pig in Captivity" 
 "National Seven" 
 "Motherless Children" (Traditional; arranged by John Renbourn)
 "Winter is Gone" (Traditional; arranged by John Renbourn)
 "Noah and Rabbit" (Renbourn, Bert Jansch)

Personnel
 John Renbourn - guitar, vocals
 Bert Jansch - guitar on "Blue Bones" and "Noah and Rabbit"
Technical
Jimmy Duncan, Nathan Joseph, Peter Attwood - recording
Brian Shuel - cover design, photography

References

1965 debut albums
John Renbourn albums
Transatlantic Records albums
Albums produced by Nathan Joseph